The Liberal Wars, also known as the Portuguese Civil War, the War of the Two Brothers or Miguelite War, was a war between liberal constitutionalists and conservative absolutists in Portugal over royal succession that lasted from 1828 to 1834. Embroiled parties included the Kingdom of Portugal, Portuguese rebels, the United Kingdom, France, the Catholic Church, and Spain.

Roots of the conflict

The death of King John VI in 1826 created a dispute over royal succession. While Dom Pedro, the Emperor of Brazil, was the king's oldest son, his younger brother Miguel contended that Pedro had forfeited his claim to the throne by declaring Brazilian independence. Pedro briefly entitled himself Dom Pedro IV of Portugal. Neither the Portuguese nor the Brazilians wanted a unified monarchy; consequently, Pedro abdicated the Portuguese throne in favor of his daughter, Maria, a child of 7. In April 1826, to settle the succession dispute, Pedro revised the first constitution of Portugal granted in 1822 and left the throne to Maria, with his sister Isabel Maria as regent.

A new constitution
In the Portuguese Constitutional Charter, Pedro attempted to reconcile absolutists and liberals by allowing both factions a role in the government. Unlike the Constitution of 1822, this new document established four branches of government. The Legislature was divided into two chambers. The upper chamber, the Chamber of Peers, was composed of life and hereditary peers and clergy appointed by the king. The lower chamber, the Chamber of Deputies, was composed of 111 deputies elected to four-year terms by the indirect vote of local assemblies, which in turn were elected by a limited suffrage of male tax-paying property owners. Judicial power was exercised by the courts; executive power by the ministers of the government; and moderative power by the king, who held an absolute veto over all legislation.

Discontent

The absolutist party of the landowners and the Church, however, were not satisfied with this compromise, and they continued to regard Miguel as the legitimate successor to the throne on the grounds that according to the Portuguese succession rules (approved by the Cortes after the 1640 Restoration), Pedro had lost the right to the Portuguese crown, and therefore to choose a successor, when he took possession of a foreign crown (Brazil). They were alarmed by the liberal reforms that had been initiated in Spain by the detested Revolutionary French (reforms which the Portuguese feudal aristocracy had been spared from) and took heart at the recent restoration of the autocratic Ferdinand VII in Spain (1823) who was eradicating all the Napoleonic innovations. In February 1828, Miguel returned to Portugal, ostensibly to take the oath of allegiance to the Charter and assume the regency. He was immediately proclaimed king by his supporters, who pressed him to return to absolutism. A month after his return, Miguel dissolved the Chamber of Deputies and the Chamber of Peers and, in May, summoned the traditional Cortes of the three estates of the realm to proclaim his accession to absolute power. The Cortes of 1828 assented to Miguel's wish, proclaiming him king as Miguel I of Portugal and nullifying the Constitutional Charter.

Rebellion

This alleged usurpation did not go unchallenged by the Liberals. On May 18, the garrison in Porto, the center of Portuguese progressives, declared its loyalty to Pedro (Dom Pedro IV) and his daughter Maria da Glória (future Maria II of Portugal), and the Constitutional Charter. The rebellion against the absolutists spread to other cities. Miguel suppressed these rebellions, and many thousands of Liberals were either arrested or fled to Spain and Britain. There followed five years of repression.

Meanwhile, in Brazil, relations between Pedro and Brazil's agricultural magnates had become strained. In April 1831, Pedro abdicated in Brazil in favor of his son, Pedro II, and sailed for Britain. He organized a military expedition there and then went to Terceira island in the Azores, which was in the hands of the Liberals, to set up a government in exile. The government of Miguel blockaded the island, but the blockading squadron was attacked by a French squadron during the run-up to the Battle of the Tagus, where several Miguelist ships were captured. In July 1832, with the backing of Liberals in Spain and England, an expedition led by king Pedro landed near Porto, in the Landing at Mindelo, which the Miguelites abandoned and where, after military activities including the Battle of Ponte Ferreira, Pedro and his associates were besieged by Miguelite forces for nearly a year. To protect British interests, a naval squadron under Commander William Nugent Glascock in HMS Orestes was stationed in the Douro, where it came under fire from both sides.

In June 1833, the Liberals, still encircled at Porto, sent to the Algarve a force commanded by the Duke of Terceira supported by a naval squadron commanded by Charles Napier, using the alias 'Carlos de Ponza'. The Duke of Terceira landed at Faro and marched north through the Alentejo to capture Lisbon on July 24. Meanwhile, Napier's squadron encountered the absolutists' fleet near Cape Saint Vincent (Cabo São Vicente) and decisively defeated it at the fourth Battle of Cape St. Vincent. The Liberals were able to occupy Lisbon, where Pedro moved from Porto and repulsed a Miguelite siege. A stalemate of nine months ensued. Spain changed sides and started to support the liberals. Towards the end of 1833, Maria da Glória was proclaimed queen, and Pedro was made regent. His first act was to confiscate the property of all who had served under king Miguel. He also suppressed all religious houses and confiscated their property, an act that suspended friendly relations with Rome for nearly eight years, until mid-1841. The absolutists controlled the rural areas, where they were supported by the aristocracy, and by a peasantry that was galvanized by the Church. The Liberals occupied Portugal's major cities, Lisbon and Porto, where they commanded a sizable following among the middle classes. Operations against the Miguelites began again in earnest in early 1834, a year marked by the end of Spanish support which had changed sides to the liberals in 1833. Meanwhile, the Liberal army had suffered a sound defeat at Alcácer do Sal, which proved that, despite the Duke of Terceira's recent march from Faro to Lisbon, the south was still loyal to the Miguelites. In the southernmost region of Continental Portugal, the region of Algarve, a man known as Remexido, hidden in the mountainous terrain around São Marcos da Serra, became a legend as a guerrilla loyal to the legistimist, antiliberal Miguelites until well after the end of the Liberal Wars.

Peace

The Battle of Asseiceira, fought on May 16, 1834, was the last and decisive engagement of the Portuguese Civil War. The Miguelist army was still formidable (about 18,000 men), but on May 26, 1834, at Evoramonte, to end the bloodbath in the country after six years of civil war a peace was declared under a concession by which Miguel formally renounced all claims to the throne of Portugal, was guaranteed an annual pension, and was definitively exiled. Pedro restored the Constitutional Charter, but he died September 24, 1834.

Maria da Glória resumed her interrupted reign as Maria II of Portugal.

See also
Liberalism in Portugal
Dissolution of the monasteries in Portugal
Joaquim António de Aguiar
Remexido
First Carlist War

References

External links

 
Wars involving France
Wars involving Portugal
Wars involving Spain
Wars involving the United Kingdom
Wars of succession involving the states and peoples of Europe
19th century in Portugal
Civil wars involving the states and peoples of Europe
Liberalism in Portugal